The Force X was a squadron of the French Navy, assembled on 29 April 1940, after the outbreak of the Second World War, to deter Italy from striking in the Levantine Sea.

Career 
Under Admiral Godfroy, the squadron departed Toulon on 25 April 1940, arriving at Alexandria on 24 May, where she met with her British counterpart under Admiral Sir Andrew Cunningham.

On 4 July 1940, a secret order from British Prime Minister Churchill, Operation Catapult, tasked the Royal Navy to destroy, neutralise or capture French naval forces. Godfroy and Cunningham having a trusting relationship, and their families being related by alliance, they engaged in negotiations and managed a compromise, whereby French ships would remove fuel from their bunkers and firing mechanisms from their weapons, and the remaining crews would not attempt to escape; in return, Cunningham promised to repatriate most of the crews, accepted that the ships retain their French commanding officers, and would not be scuttled. The heavy cruiser Duquesne would be allowed to radio official messages, and private messages once a week. On the occasion, several officers deserted to join the Free French, such as Commander Auboyneau, or Lieutenant-Commander d'Estienne d'Orves and his companions Roger Barberot and André Patou. The ships were then interned at Alexandria with skeleton crews. Godfroy and Cunningham signed the convention on 7 July, and renewed it on 20 June 1942.

On 30 May 1943, following the invasion of the so-called Free Zone by the Nazis, the whole of Force X joined the Allies. Admiral Godfroy was thus granted authorisation from the British to put to sea, and put his forces at the disposal of the provisional government in Algiers, as the French Committee of National Liberation was put in place. The squadron rallied Dakar through the Suez Canal and Cape Town, before arriving at Algiers. Upon his arrival, Godfroy, suspected of favouring General Giraud over De Gaulle, was retired by decree in December 1943.

Order of battle 

 Battleship Lorraine
 Heavy cruiser Duquesne
 Heavy cruiser Suffren
 Heavy cruiser Tourville
 Light cruiser Duguay-Trouin
 Destroyer 
 Destroyer 
 Destroyer Fortuné
 six torpedo boats
 Submarine Protée

Sources and references

Bibliography 

 René Godfroy, L’Aventure de la force X (escadre française de la Méditerranée orientale) à Alexandrie, Plon, Paris, 1953.

References

External links 

 L'escadre d'Alexandrie rentre dans la guerre, article du 3 juin 1943 du Courrier de l'Air à Londres.

History of the French Navy